Kenneth Møller Pedersen (born 18 April 1973) is a former Danish professional football midfielder.

External links
 official Danish Superliga stats

1973 births
Living people
Danish men's footballers
Danish Superliga players
Ikast FS players
Odense Boldklub players
Esbjerg fB players
FC Midtjylland players
Randers FC players
Footballers from Odense

Association football midfielders